The Gymnastics event at the 2010 Commonwealth Games was held at Indira Gandhi Arena.

Artistic

Artistic gymnastics was held from 4–8 October 2010.

Qualification
Men's Events

Qualification
Women's Events

Rhythmic

Rhythmic gymnastics was held from 12–14 October 2010.

Overall medal table

Participating nations

References

 
2010 Commonwealth Games events
2010
International gymnastics competitions hosted by India
Commonwealth Games